Nicholas V (1876–1939) served as Greek Patriarch of Alexandria between 1936 and 1939.

He worked very hard on the internal reorganization of the philanthropic institutions of the Church and the harmonious operation of the educational institutes.

References

20th-century Greek Patriarchs of Alexandria
Year of birth unknown
1876 births
1939 deaths